The canton of Arpajon is an administrative division of the Essonne department, Île-de-France region, northern France. Its borders were modified at the French canton reorganisation which came into effect in March 2015. Its seat is in Arpajon.

It consists of the following communes:

Arpajon
Avrainville
Boissy-sous-Saint-Yon
Bouray-sur-Juine
Bruyères-le-Châtel
Cheptainville
Égly
Guibeville
Janville-sur-Juine
Lardy
Leuville-sur-Orge
La Norville
Ollainville
Saint-Germain-lès-Arpajon
Saint-Yon
Torfou

References

Cantons of Essonne